Athletic club may refer to:
A private Club (organization) which provides sports facilities to members
A sports club or umbrella organization dedicated to various athletic and spring activities
 Athletic Club, the formal name of the Spanish and Basque association football club known in English as Athletic Bilbao
 Athletic Club Femenino, this club's women's football section

See also